The 1992 United States presidential election in Pennsylvania took place on November 3, 1992, and was part of the 1992 United States presidential election. Voters chose 23 representatives, or electors to the Electoral College, who voted for president and vice president.

Pennsylvania was won by Governor Bill Clinton (D) by a margin of 9.02%. Billionaire businessman Ross Perot (I-TX) finished in third, with 18.20% of Pennsylvania’s popular vote. , this is the last election in which Clearfield County voted for a Democratic Presidential candidate. This is also the last time that Pennsylvania voted to the left of Connecticut, Delaware, Maine, Michigan, and New Jersey, and to the right of Missouri. This is also the last time a Republican received over 20% of the vote in Philadelphia in a presidential election.

Primaries

Democratic Primary

Republican Primary

Results

 List of United States presidential elections in Pennsylvania

Results by county

References

Pennsylvania
1992
1992 Pennsylvania elections